Brooke Miller is a Canadian singer-songwriter and musician.

Early life
Miller was born in Montague, Prince Edward Island, Canada on January 14, 1982.  She played saxophone as a child and took up the guitar when she was ten years old. Around age 11 she began writing her own songs and at age 12 formed a trio that eventually toured the Maritimes as an opening act for other bands.

Career
Miller released her first independent CD, Lending an Hourglass, in 2003. A fellow musician, Don Ross, produced her follow-up CD and Miller later married him. She was signed to Sony/ATV Music Publishing in New York City and released the album You Can See Everything on Sony's Hickory Records in 2007. The album was produced by Ross and Peter Lubin, and mixed by Frank Filipetti.

In 2010 Miller released the self-produced album Shake It Off on Candyrat Records. In 2011, her self-titled album featuring new material, and new versions of previously released songs, was issued on the Universal Music Group label. In 2012, Miller released an audiophile SACD/LP recording, entitled "Familiar", on the German hi-fi label Stockfisch Records.

Miller reports that her music has been influenced by Leon Redbone,  Ricki Lee Jones, Bonnie Raitt, Bruce Cockburn,  Ani DiFranco, Joni Mitchell and The Police.

Discography

Albums
2003: Lending an Hourglass, Independent
2007: You Can See Everything, Hickory/Sony/ATV
2010: Shake It Off, Candyrat
2011: Brooke Miller, Sparkle Plenty/Universal
2012: Familiar, Stockfisch
2016: Impossible Story, https://brookemiller.bandcamp.com

References 

Living people
1982 births
People from Kings County, Prince Edward Island
Musicians from Halifax, Nova Scotia
Canadian rock musicians
Canadian singer-songwriters
21st-century Canadian women singers
Stockfisch Records artists
Hickory Records artists